The .338-378 Weatherby Magnum started out as the wildcat cartridge, .338-378 Keith-Thomson Magnum during the early 1960s. Keith and Thomson are Elmer Keith and R.W. "Bob" Thomson. The 338-378 Keith-Thomson Magnum is a quarter of an inch shorter than the full length 338-378 Weatherby Magnum, this was because they thought it was better balanced with the slowest powder generally available at that time (H4831).  The .338-378 Weatherby Magnum was added to the Weatherby product line in 1998.

The .338-378 Weatherby Magnum's parent case is the .378 Weatherby Magnum. The .338-378 Weatherby Magnum is created by necking down the .378 Weatherby Magnum to 8.59 mm (.338 in) then fire forming it in the rifle chamber. The .338-378 Weatherby Magnum has a case capacity of about 8.1 g (125 gr). Bullets commercially available for the .338-378 Weatherby Magnum range from: 11.7 g (180 gr) to 19.4 g (300 gr) in the construction of; boat-tail hollow-point; boat-tail pointed soft; pointed soft point; heavy jacketed pointed soft point; partition; multi-core; truncated solid and monolithic solid.

The .338-378 Weatherby Magnum's main appeal is long-range shooting. A Weatherby factory cartridge loaded with a 16.2 g (250 gr) hunting bullet, in a rifle with a 71 cm (28 in) barrel will yield a muzzle velocity of 933 m/s (3060 ft/s) and muzzle energy of 7046 J (5197 ft·lbf).  This same bullet will carry a down range velocity to 457 m (500 yd) of 648 m/s (2125 ft/s) and energy of 3391 J (2501 ft · lbf).

A hand loaded .338-378 Weatherby Magnum used for 1000 yd target shooting loaded with a 19.4 g (300 gr) boat-tail hollow point from a rifle with a 71 cm (28 in) target barrel will yield a muzzle velocity of 917 m/s (3010 ft/s), at 914 m (1000 yd) will carry a down range velocity of 590 m/s (1936 ft/s) and at 1372 m (1500 yd) will still be carrying a supersonic down range velocity of 462 m/s (1517 ft/s).

The .338-378 Weatherby Magnum is appropriate for hunting all game animals on the North American, European and Asian continents. In Africa the 338-378 Weatherby Magnum is appropriate for taking medium and large game.

The free recoil of the 338-378 Weatherby Magnum from a (11 lb) rifle (including magazine rounds, scope, base and rings) is 73 J (54 ft · lbf) as compared to an average 27 J (20 ft · lbf) from a rifle chambered for .30-06 Springfield.

The Finnish .338 Lapua Magnum (.338 LM) cartridge introduced in 1989, the American .338 Remington Ultra Magnum (.338 RUM) cartridge introduced in 2000 and the Swedish .338 Norma Magnum (.338 NM) cartridge introduced in 2008 are probably the closest currently (2018) commercially available ballistic twins of the .338-378 Weatherby Magnum. The Lapua and Norma cartridges are rimless and the Remington has a rebated rim.

See also
List of rifle cartridges
8 mm caliber

References

Pistol and rifle cartridges
Weatherby Magnum rifle cartridges
Wildcat cartridges